Dongyang Mirae University (formerly Dongyang Technical College) is an industrial technical university in Seoul, South Korea. Its campus is in the city's Guro-gu district. The current president is Han In-seung (한인승). More than 105 instructors are employed.

Academics
 School of Mechanical Engineering
 Department of Robotics and Automation Engineering
 Department of Electrical and Electronic Communication Engineering
 Department of Computer Science and Engineering
 Department of Environmental Engineering
 Faculty of Business Administration
 
You can visit the official link for more information https://www.dongyang.ac.kr/sites/dongyang/intro/index.html

History
The college opened in 1965 as Dongyang Advanced Industrial Technical School (Hangul: 동양공업고등전문학교).

See also
 Education in South Korea
 List of colleges and universities in South Korea

External links
 Dongyang Mirae University Homepage, in English

Vocational education in South Korea
Universities and colleges in Seoul
Educational institutions established in 1965
1965 establishments in South Korea